Fritzsch is a German surname, also spelt Fritsch, Fritsche and Fritzsche, a patronymic derived from Friedrich.

Notable people with the surname include:
 Christian Fritzsch (1695–1769), German engraver 
 Cladius Detlev Fritzsch (1765–1841), Danish painter
 Harald Fritzsch (born 1943), German physicist
 Johannes Fritzsch (born 1960), German conductor
 Karl Fritzsch (1903–1945), German SS concentration camp commandant who was the first to use Zyklon B for mass murder
 Walter Fritzsch (1920–1997), German footballer and trainer

See also
 Variations of the name:
 Fritsch
 Fritsche
 Fritzsche
 Frič, Czechized variation of the name

German-language surnames
Surnames from given names